Kim Bodnia (born 12 April 1965) is a Danish actor, writer, and director. He became widely known for his role as police detective Martin Rohde in the Scandinavian crime drama series The Bridge. He became internationally known for his lead role as drug dealer Frank in Nicolas Winding Refn's 1996 directorial debut Pusher. Today he is best known as Konstantin in Phoebe Waller-Bridge's 2018 BBC America spy thriller TV series Killing Eve.

In 2009, Bodnia won the 62nd Bodil Award for Best Actor in a Supporting Role, and in 2014 he won the Monte-Carlo Television Festival Award for Outstanding Actor in a Drama Series. In 2019 he earned a British Academy Television Award for Best Supporting Actor for his role in Killing Eve.

Early life
Bodnia was born in Copenhagen on 12 April 1965 and grew up in Espergærde. He comes from a Jewish family with Polish and Russian ancestry. In 2014, he described himself as "half-Russian, half-Polish and all Jewish". When asked in 2011 whether religion had been an important aspect of his life, he said, "No, but I believe in nature."

Bodnia admitted that he was not a particularly good student as a child, describing himself as a "clown" who was reluctant to study. His main interest was in athletics, particularly the 100 metres and the long jump, in which he was the Zealand youth champion for several years. He aspired to become a football goalkeeper, but a foot injury prevented him from pursuing this career.

As a student at Espergærde Ungdomsskole, Bodnia joined the theatre group, performing mainly in comic roles. When he was 16, his mother suggested he apply for a place at the Danish National School of Theatre and Contemporary Dance. His first application failed, but he gained entry on his second attempt a year later in 1987.

Career
In his film debut En Afgrund af frihed (An Abyss of Freedom) (1989) he played a small supporting role as a bouncer. One of his first roles after graduation in 1991 was as Patrick Bateman in a stage version of American Psycho, and he was subsequently often typecast as violent, brutal characters. Bodnia's first leading role in a film was in Bulldozer (1993), directed by Maria Sødahl. His breakout role came a year later in Ole Bornedal's horror film Nightwatch (1994).

Despite this success it was two years before his next film, Nicolas Winding Refn's Pusher (1996), and then Winding Refn's Bleeder (1999). He has since appeared in Terribly Happy (2008), and in three Lasse Spang Olsen films: In China They Eat Dogs (1999) and its sequel Old Men in New Cars (2002), and in Den Gode Strømer (2004), which he co-wrote with the director. Bodnia has also appeared in several Norwegian films, including Himmelfall (2002), Monstertorsdag (2004), and Tomme Tønner (2010). He appeared in the 2011 Indian English comedy film Delhi Belly playing a Russian smuggler. In 2014 he appeared as the eponymous Iranian interrogator Rosewater, directed by Jon Stewart. As to his role, he said: "It was a tough job because I'm Jewish. I'm playing a guy who really hates me and wants to destroy my country."

Bodnia has become internationally known for his television roles. He made his first appearance in the historical mini-series Snapphanar in 2006. He appeared in three episodes of the first season of the crime series The Killing (2007), and in two episodes of the comedy drama Hvor fanden er Herning? ("Where the hell is Herning?") (2009), before returning to crime series, appearing in episodes of the Swedish Kommissarie Winter (2010), Den som dræber ("Those Who Kill") (2011), and the German/Swedish Der Kommissar und das Meer ("The Inspector and the Sea") (2012).

In 2009 he won the 62nd Bodil Award for Best Actor in a Supporting Role. In 2014 he won the Monte-Carlo Television Festival Award for Outstanding Actor in a Drama Series.

Bodnia played the Danish detective Martin Rohde in the first two series of the Nordic noir crime television programme The Bridge (Broen|Bron) (2011–present). Created and written by Hans Rosenfeldt, it is a joint creative and financed production between Sweden's Sveriges Television and Denmark's DR. It has been shown in over 100 countries. Although Bodnia signed for the third series, he dropped out, reportedly unhappy with the development of his character. He also voiced concerns in an interview about working in Malmö, due to the city's problems with anti-semitism, which had made his decision to leave the series easier. He said: "it’s not very nice and comfortable to be there as a Jewish person."

As director
In 2001 Bodnia co-wrote and directed the short film Escape - Flugten fra ensomheden ("Escape - Flight from loneliness"). In early 2014 he directed readings of The Tailor's Tale, a play based on his Jewish grandfather's experience of life in Copenhagen under Nazi occupation, written by his cousin Alexander Bodin Saphir, and performed at the Scandinavia House–The Nordic Center in America in New York.

Personal life
Bodnia has been married twice. His first marriage was to actress Lotte Andersen, with whom he has a son, who is also an actor. He is currently married to actress Rikke Louise Andersson, who played his wife in Bleeder, with whom he has two sons and a daughter.

Filmography

References

External links

 Official site
 
 

1965 births
Living people
Danish male film actors
Danish male television actors
Jewish Danish actors
20th-century Danish male actors
21st-century Danish male actors
Male actors from Copenhagen
Danish people of Polish-Jewish descent
Danish people of Russian-Jewish descent
People from Helsingør Municipality
Danish film directors
Danish male screenwriters
Best Supporting Actor Bodil Award winners